A devil is the personification of evil as it is conceived in many and various cultures and religious traditions.

Devil or Devils may also refer to:
 Satan
 Devil in Christianity
 Demon
 Folk devil

Art,  entertainment,  and media

Film and television 
 The Devil (1908 film), a 1908 film directed by D. W. Griffith
 The Devil (1915 film), an American film starring Bessie Barriscale
 The Devil (1918 Hungarian film), a Hungarian film directed by Michael Curtiz
 The Devil (1918 German film), a German silent mystery film
 The Devil (1921 film), an American film starring George Arliss
 To Bed or Not to Bed (also known as The Devil), a 1963 Italian film
 The Devils (film), a 1971 British film directed by Ken Russell
 The Devil (1972 film), a Polish film
 Devil (TV series), a 2008 Japanese television series remake of the South Korean series
 Devil (2010 film), a supernatural-thriller film produced by M. Night Shyamalan
 Devil (2011 film), an Argentine drama film directed by Nicanor Loretti
 Devils (TV series), an Italian English language television drama series
 The Devil (South Korean TV series), a 2023 television series

Games and characters
 Devil (Dungeons & Dragons)
 Devilish (video game), a 1991 multiplatform action video game
 Bio-Devil, a line of bosses from the Mega Man series
 The Devil, an evil villainous character who is a version of Satan and a villain and final boss from the video game Cuphead
 Kazuya Mishima, Tekken character with Devil as his alter-ego
 Devil, a fictional wolf companion of the Phantom

Literature
 The Devil (Molnár play), a 1907 play by Ferenc Molnár
 The Devil (novel), a 1911 novel by Leo Tolstoy
 The Devil (Javid play), a 1918 play by Huseyn Javid
 Demons (Dostoevsky novel) (also The Devils), an 1871 novel by Fyodor Dostoevsky
 Devils (anthology), an anthology of themed fantasy and science fiction short stories

Music

Albums and EPs
 Devil (Babes in Toyland album), 2000
 Devil (Chiodos album), 2014
 Devil (Die Ärzte album), a reissue of the 1984 Die Ärzte album Debil
 Devil (Lydia album), 2013
 Devil (Super Junior album), 2015
 Devil, a 2020 mixtape by Virgen María and A.K.A.
 Devils (The 69 Eyes album), 2004
 Devils (Xmal Deutschland album), 1989
 The Devil (album), a 2015 album by Blue Stahli
 Devil (EP), a 2022 EP by Max

Songs
 "Devil" (CLC song), 2019
 "Devil" (Shinedown song), 2018
 "Devil" (Stereophonics song), 2005
 "Devil", a song by Cash Cash from Blood, Sweat & 3 Years
 "Devil", a song by Gothminister from Gothic Electronic Anthems
 "Devil", a song by Lydia from Devil
 "Devil", a song by Ronnie Radke from the mixtape Watch Me
 "Devil", a song by Staind from Chapter V
 "Devil", a song by Super Junior from Devil
 "DDevil", a song by System of a Down from their self-titled album
 "The Devil", a song by Blue Stahli from The Devil

Food
To devil, to cook with spicy sauce as in
 Devilled eggs 
 Devilled kidneys

Places
 Devils Branch (disambiguation), several streams in the United States
 Devil Canyon Creek, San Diego County, California
 Devil Cape, Greenland
 Devils Crags, Sierra Nevada, California
 Devil's Lake (disambiguation)
 Devils Mountain (disambiguation)
 Devil's Peak (disambiguation)
 Devil River, Tasman Region, New Zealand
 Devil's Tower (disambiguation)

Roles
 Devilling, to be a trainee in the legal systems of the United Kingdom and Ireland
 Printer's devil, a printer's apprentice

Sports
 Elimination race, the discipline in track cycling known colloquially as "the Devil" 
 New Jersey Devils, an NHL ice hockey team
 A.C. Milan, an Italian football club nicknamed "The Devil"

Other uses
 The Devil (Tarot card)
 DevIL, an open source image library
 Jersey Devil, a legendary creature of southern New Jersey folklore.
 Tasmanian devil, a carnivorous marsupial
 Thorny devil, an Australian desert lizard
 Willy (textile machine), also known as twilly-devil or devil

See also
 Demon (disambiguation)
 Satan (disambiguation)